Heritage Regional High School is a public secondary school located in Longueuil. Before being known as Heritage, the school was known as MacDonald-Cartier Memorial High School.

HRTV
Heritage Regional High School is the owner of its own television studio and Media Studies program. It became defunct a few years later.

iCan
The iCan program is a program for students with interest in computers. The program consists of a condensed schedule like Sports Excellence; but, instead of doing sports, every student has two hours of time to work on various projects on the computer. Some examples of projects in Secondary 1 are Scratch, making an agenda cover page, and learning HTML. In Secondary 2, students do some of the same things, but with some more advanced projects such as learning Photoshop.  In Secondary 3, projects may include learning Photoshop, HTML, Python, SQL, and 3D image rendering.

IBO plays 2006
The Secondary 4 IBO students performed several plays on stage. The theme was media, which included movies and television shows. A variety of different plays were also performed.

In 2008, the plays were presented again during the IBO open fair to give parents, students and others who had missed the original performances to see them.

Plays performed
 The Flintstones
 CSI Miami
 Cinderella
 The Nanny
 The 10th Kingdom
 Will & Grace
 Fawlty Towers
 That '70s Show
 Guard Show

Clubs

Environment Club
The HRHS Environmental Club belongs to Roots and Shoots, a program offered by the Jane Goodall Institute. The club has been active for many years, although not only at HRHS. The club was started by  Coleen Carter when she was working at RVR High School. When she came to teach at the new Heritage Regional High School (renamed from MacDonald Cartier Memorial High School), the Environmental Club followed.

In the last few years, the club has raised several hundred dollars for various charities; adopted a whale, owl, chimpanzee, and polar bear; and collected over 2000 old prescription eyeglasses and over 200 pounds of plastic and aluminum tabs for recycling.

References

External links 
 HRHS's website
 Riverside School Board Portal

English-language schools in Quebec
High schools in Longueuil
International Baccalaureate schools in Quebec
Riverside School Board
Educational institutions in Canada with year of establishment missing